The Plantain Garden River is a river in the parish of St Thomas on the island of Jamaica. It is the only major river in Jamaica that does not flow in a northerly or southerly direction.

See also
List of rivers of Jamaica
Enriquillo–Plantain Garden fault zone

References
 GEOnet Names Server
OMC Map
CIA Map
Ford, Jos C. and Finlay, A.A.C. (1908).The Handbook of Jamaica. Jamaica Government Printing Office

Rivers of Jamaica